Christos Kryparakos (born 12 June 2003) is a Greek professional footballer who plays as a midfielder for Super League 2 club Panathinaikos B.

References

2003 births
Living people
Greece youth international footballers
Super League Greece 2 players
Panathinaikos F.C. players
Association football midfielders
Footballers from Athens
Greek footballers
Panathinaikos F.C. B players